Anarchism is book-length study of anarchism written by Paul Eltzbacher. It was originally published in 1900 and quickly translated into five languages, including English in 1908 by Steven T. Byington.

Contents 

Eltzbacher gives straightforward descriptions of seven major figures in anarchism: Godwin, Proudhon, Stirner, Bakunin, Kropotkin, Tucker, and Tolstoy. He is not a sympathetic critic.

Publication 

Originally published in 1900, Eltzbacher's book was quickly translated into Spanish (1901), French (1902), Russian (1903), and Dutch (1903). Steven T. Byington translated the English version for publication by Benjamin Tucker in 1908. The English translation was reprinted in 1960 by the Libertarian Book Club of New York. The reprint's editor preface provides a history of the book's publication and details on the author, translator, and publisher. But it also introduces errors, particularly in the Proudhon section.

Reception and legacy 

Eltzbacher's Anarchism was among the most accessible compilations of anarchist writings in the early twentieth century. It was and remains among the most read studies of the subject.

Kropotkin himself, in his 1910 Encyclopædia Britannica article on "Anarchism", commended the book as the best and most fair work on the topic, written with a full knowledge of anarchist literature.

References

Bibliography 

 
 
 
 
 
 
 
 
 
 
 
 More in 
 https://books.google.com/books?id=u_evIt8DtO8C&pg=PA1
 https://books.google.com/books?id=ux-xAMFUY2gC&pg=PA281
 https://books.google.com/books?id=1iUxDwAAQBAJ&pg=PT477

External links 

 

1900 non-fiction books
Books about anarchism
German non-fiction books